Samuel Jones Wilkin (December 17, 1793 – March 11, 1866) was a U.S. representative from New York, son of James W. Wilkin.

Born in Goshen, New York, Wilkin graduated from Princeton College in 1812.

He studied law. He was admitted to the bar in 1815 and practiced in Goshen.

He was a member of the New York State Assembly (Orange Co.) in 1824 and 1825.

Wilkin was elected as an Anti-Jacksonian to the Twenty-second Congress (March 4, 1831 – March 3, 1833).

He was an unsuccessful Whig candidate for election in 1844 as Lieutenant Governor of New York.

He was a member of the New York State Senate (9th D.) in 1848 and 1849. He was a state canal appraiser in 1850.

He died in Goshen, New York, March 11, 1866. He was interred in Slate Hill Cemetery.

His son, Alexander Wilkin, died in the Civil War.

Sources

1793 births
1866 deaths
Princeton University alumni
19th-century American politicians
National Republican Party members of the United States House of Representatives from New York (state)
People from Goshen, New York